Sangestan Rural District is a rural district (dehestan) in the Central District of Hamadan County, Hamadan Province, Iran. At the 2006 census, its population was 11,909, in 3,146 families. The rural district has 22 villages.

References 

Rural Districts of Hamadan Province
Hamadan County